A controlled or prescribed burn, also known as hazard reduction burning, backfire, swailing, or a burn-off, is a fire set intentionally for purposes of forest management, fire suppression, farming, prairie restoration or greenhouse gas abatement. A controlled burn may also refer to the intentional burning of slash and fuels through burn piles. Fire is a natural part of both forest and grassland ecology and controlled fire can be a tool for foresters.

Hazard reduction or controlled burning is conducted during the cooler months to reduce fuel buildup and decrease the likelihood of serious hotter fires. Controlled burning stimulates the germination of some desirable forest trees, and reveals soil mineral layers which increases seedling vitality, thus renewing the forest. Some cones, such as those of lodgepole pine, sequoia and many chaparral shrubs are pyriscent, meaning heat from fire opens cones to disperse seeds.

In industrialized countries, controlled burning is usually overseen by fire control authorities for regulations and permits.

History

There are two basic causes of wildfires. One is natural, mainly through lightning, and the other is human activity. Controlled burns have a long history in wildland management. Pre-agricultural societies used fire to regulate both plant and animal life. Fire history studies have documented periodic wildland fires ignited by indigenous peoples in North America and Australia. Native Americans frequently used fire to manage natural environments in a way that benefited humans and wildlife, starting low-intensity fires that released nutrients for plants, reduced competition, and consumed excess flammable material that otherwise would eventually fuel high-intensity, catastrophic fires.

Fires, both naturally caused and prescribed, were once part of natural landscapes in many areas. In the US these practices ended in the early 20th century, when federal fire policies were enacted with the goals of suppressing all fires. Since 1995, the US Forest Service has slowly incorporated burning practices into its forest management policies.

Fire suppression has changed the composition and ecology of North American habitats, including highly fire-dependent ecosystems such as oak savannas and canebrakes, which are now critically endangered habitats on the brink of extinction. In the Eastern United States, fire-sensitive trees such as the red maple are increasing in number, at the expense of fire-tolerant ones like oaks.

Back burning 

Back burning is the term given to the process of lighting vegetation in such a way that it has to burn against the prevailing wind. This produces a slower moving and more controllable fire. However this term is also colloquially used to mean all of controlled burning as well.

This process is commonly used for hazard reduction burns and the preparation of fire breaks to enable controlled or hazard reduction burns. Back burning involves starting small fires along a man-made or natural firebreak in front of a main fire front. Back burning reduces the amount of fuel that is available to the main fire by the time that it reaches the burnt area.

Back burning is utilized in controlled burning and during wildfire events. While controlled burns utilize back burning during planned fire events to create a "black line", back burning or backfiring is also done to stop a wildfire that is already in progress. Firebreaks are also often used as an anchor point to start a line of fires along natural or manmade features such as a river, road or a bulldozed clearing. It is called back burning because the small fires are designed to "burn back" towards the main fire front and are usually burning and traveling against ground level winds.

The expression fight fire with fire is derived from the concept of back burning.

Forest use
Another consideration is the issue of fire prevention. In Florida, during the drought in 1995, catastrophic wildfires burned numerous homes. Each year, additional leaf litter and dropped branches increased the likelihood of a hot and uncontrollable fire.

Controlled burns are sometimes ignited using a tool known as the driptorch, which allows a steady stream of flaming fuel to be directed to the ground as needed. Variations on the driptorch can be used such as the helitorch, which is mounted on a helicopter, or other improvised devices such as mounting a driptorch-like device on the side of a vehicle. A pyrotechnic device known as a fusee can be used for ignition in nearby fuels while a flare gun can be used to ignite fuels farther away.

For the burning of slash, waste materials left over from logging, there are several types of controlled burns. Broadcast burning is the burning of scattered slash over a wide area. Pile burning is gathering up the slash into piles before burning. These burning piles may be referred to as bonfires. High temperatures can harm the soil, damaging it physically, chemically or sterilizing it. Broadcast burns tend to have lower temperatures and will not harm the soil as much as pile burning, though steps can be taken to treat the soil after a burn. In lop and scatter burning, slash is left to compact over time, or is compacted with machinery. This produces a lower intensity fire, as long as the slash is not packed too tightly. However, soil may be damaged if machinery is used to compress the slash.

Controlled burning reduces fuels, may improve wildlife habitat, controls competing vegetation, improves short term forage for grazing, improves accessibility, helps control tree disease, and perpetuates fire dependent species. In mature longleaf pine forest, it helps maintain habitat for endangered red-cockaded woodpeckers in their sandhill and flatwoods habitats. Fire is also felt to be a crucial element of the recovery of the threatened Louisiana pine snake in the longleaf pine forests of central Louisiana and eastern Texas. To improve the application of prescribed burns for conservation goals, which may involve mimicking historical or natural fire regimes, scientists assess the impact of variation in fire attributes. Fire frequency is the most discussed fire attribute in the scientific literature, likely because it is considered the most critical fire regime aspect. Scientists less often report data concerning the effects of variation in other fire attributes (i.e., intensity, severity, patchiness, spatial scale, or phenology), even though these also likely impact conservation goals.

In the wild, many trees depend on fire as a successful way to clear out the competition and release their seeds. In particular, the giant sequoia depends on fire to reproduce: the cones of the tree open after a fire releases their seeds, the fire having cleared all competing vegetation. Due to fire suppression efforts during the early and mid 20th century, low-intensity fires no longer occurred naturally in many groves, and still do not occur in some groves today. The suppression of fires also led to ground fuel build-up and the dense growth which posed the risk of catastrophic wildfires. In the 1970s, the National Park Service began systematic fires for the purpose of new seed growth. Eucalyptus regnans or mountain ash of Australia also depends on fire but in a different fashion. They carry their seeds in capsules which can deposit at any time of the year. Being flammable, during a fire the capsules drop nearly all of their seeds and the fire consumes the eucalypt adults, but most of the seeds survive using the ash as a source of nutrients; at their rate of growth, they quickly dominate the land and a new eucalyptus forest grows.

The province of Ontario, Canada implements safety procedures and regulations to manage and control wild land fires. They follow these procedures strictly to protect the safety of locals and ensure that the fire does not spread into other areas on land, thus protecting the biodiversity of the forests' ecosystem.

Agricultural use

In addition to forest management, controlled burning is also used in agriculture. In the developing world, this is often referred to as slash and burn. In industrialized nations, it is seen as one component of shifting cultivation, as a part of field preparation for planting. Often called field burning, this technique is used to clear the land of any existing crop residue as well as kill weeds and weed seeds. Field burning is less expensive than most other methods such as herbicides or tillage, but because it produces smoke and other fire-related pollutants, its use is not popular in agricultural areas bounded by residential housing.

In the United States, field burning is a legislative and regulatory issue at both the federal and state levels of government.

In Northern-India, especially, In Punjab and Haryana, Crop Residue Burning is a major problem. CRB leads to degradation in environmental quality in these and neighboring states including capital of India, New Delhi.

In East Africa, bird densities increased months after controlled burning had occurred.

Grouse moors

In the north of Great Britain, large areas of grouse moors are managed by burning in a practice known as muirburn. This kills trees and grasses, preventing natural succession, and generates the mosaic of ling (heather) of different ages which allows very large populations of red grouse to be reared for shooting.

Controversies 

In Oregon, field burning has been widely used by grass seed farmers as a method for clearing fields for the next round of planting, as well as revitalizing serotinous grasses that require fire in order to grow seed again. The Oregon Department of Environmental Quality began requiring a permit for farmers to burn their fields in 1981, but the requirements became stricter in 1988 following a multi-car collision in which smoke from field burning near Albany, Oregon, obscured the vision of drivers on Interstate 5, leading to a 23-car collision in which 7 people died and 37 were injured. This resulted in more scrutiny of field burning and proposals to ban field burning in the state altogether.

In the European Union, burning crop stubble after harvest is used by farmers for plant health reasons under several restrictions in the cross compliance regulations.

Driven Grouse shooting is practiced on moors managed through controlled burning. 

With controlled burns, there is also a risk that the fires get out of control. For example, the Calf Canyon/Hermits Peak Fire, the largest wildfire in the history of New Mexico, was started by two distinct instances of controlled burns, which had both been set by the US Forest Service, getting out of control and merging.

Political history 
The conflict of controlled burn policy in the United States has roots in the historical campaigns to combat wildfires and to the eventual acceptance of fire as a necessary ecological phenomenon. The notion of fire as a tool had somewhat evolved by the late 1970s as the National Park Service authorized and administered controlled burns. While the methodology was still relatively new, the Yellowstone fires of 1988 occurred, which significantly politicized fire management. The ensuing media coverage was a spectacle that was vulnerable to misinformation. Reports drastically inflated the scale of the fires which disposed politicians in Wyoming, Idaho, and Montana to believe that all fires represented a loss of revenue from tourism. Partially as a result of millions of dollars lost in estimates, stricter data recording was enforced and thresholds were established for determining which fires must be suppressed. Paramount to the new action plans is the suppression of fires that threaten the loss of human life with leniency toward areas of historic, scientific, or special ecological interest. Since 1988, many states have made progress toward controlled burns but with a proclivity toward forgetfulness between fire events. Senators Ron Wyden and Mike Crapo of Oregon and Idaho have been moving to reduce the shifting of capital from fire prevention to fire suppression following the harsh fires of 2017 in both states.

Procedure 

Depending on the context and goals of a prescribed fire, additional planning may be necessary. While the most common driver of fuel treatment is the prevention of loss of human life, certain parameters can also be changed to promote biodiversity and to rearrange stand ages appropriately. The risk of fatal fires can also be reduced proactively by reducing ground fuels before they can create a fuel ladder and begin an active crown fire. Predictions show thinned forests lead to mitigated fire intensity and flame length compared to untouched or fire-proofed areas. Furthermore, low-intensity fire treatments can be administered in places where mechanized treatments such as disc harrowing cannot. In the interests of conservation, electing for a mixed mosaic of unburnt islands within the targeted area maintains biodiversity and provides cover for wildlife. Because of this, some suggest fuel reductions of about 75% to be sufficient, though each burn plan should have its own target set by ecological and management goals. In some areas where grasses and herbaceous plants thrive, species variation and cover can drastically increase a few years after fuel treatments.

Greenhouse gas abatement

Controlled burns on Australian savannas can result in an overall reduction of greenhouse gas emissions. One working example is the West Arnhem Fire Management Agreement, started to bring "strategic fire management across  of Western Arnhem Land" to partially offset greenhouse gas emissions from a liquefied natural gas plant in Darwin, Australia. Deliberately starting controlled burns early in the dry season results in a mosaic of burnt and unburnt country which reduces the area of stronger, late dry season fires; it is also known as "patch burning". To minimise the impact of smoke, burning should be restricted to daylight hours whenever possible.

See also
Agroecology
Fire ecology
Fire-stick farming
Native American use of fire in ecosystems
Wildfire suppression

References

Further reading
 Beese, W.J., Blackwell, B.A., Green, R.N. & Hawkes, B.C. (2006). "Prescribed burning impacts on some coastal British Columbia ecosystems." Information Report BC-X-403. Victoria B.C.: Natural Resources Canada, Canadian Forest Service, Pacific Forestry Centre. Retrieved from: http://hdl.handle.net/10613/2740
 Casals P, Valor T, Besalú A, Molina-Terrén D. Understory fuel load and structure eight to nine years after prescribed burning in Mediterranean pine forests. DOI: 10.1016/j.foreco.2015.11.050
 Valor T, González-Olabarria JR, Piqué M. Assessing the impact of prescribed burning on the growth of European pines. DOI: 10.1016/j.foreco.2015.02.002.

External links 

U.S. National Park Service Prescribed Fire Policy
Savanna Oak Foundation article on controlled burns
The Nature Conservancy's Global Fire Initiative

Wildfire ecology
Wildfire prevention
Habitat management equipment and methods
Agriculture and the environment
Wildfires
Forestry and the environment
Ecological techniques